The Sigma fp is a 24.6-megapixel full-frame mirrorless interchangeable-lens camera made by Sigma.

The Sigma fp won the Good Design Gold Award in 2019.

References

fp
Cameras introduced in 2019
Full-frame mirrorless interchangeable lens cameras
L-mount cameras